Andy is a 1965 drama film written, produced, and directed by Richard C. Sarafian and starring Norman Alden. It was Sarafians first directing credit for a feature film.

Plot

Cast

Production
The film was a "quasi-autobiographical piece," derived from Sarafian's memories of his early days in New York City. Sarafian had been working on the screenplay for years with his wife Joan Altman. It was financed for $300,000 by Universal Pictures  under its short-lived "New Horizons" program for up-and-coming filmmakers.

Sarafian's brother-in-law Robert Altman wanted the rights to the film, which he planned to direct with Dan Blocker in the lead role. Sarafian refused, which led to a permanent split between the two men.

See also
Charly
Walter

References

External links 

1965 films
1965 drama films
American black-and-white films
American drama films
Films about mental health
Films scored by Robert Prince
Films set in New York City
Films shot in New York City
Universal Pictures films
1965 directorial debut films
Films directed by Richard C. Sarafian
1960s English-language films
1960s American films